Jang Cheol-soo (born 1974) is a South Korean film director.

Filmography 
The Coast Guard (2002)  - assistant director
Spring, Summer, Fall, Winter... and Spring (2003) - 1st assistant director, assistant editor
Samaritan Girl (2004) - 1st assistant director, assistant editor
Love, So Divine (2004) - 1st assistant director
Escalator to Heaven (short film) (2006) - director, screenwriter
Bedevilled (2010) - director
Secretly, Greatly (2013) - director, script editor
Murder at Honeymoon Hotel (2016) - director
SF8 ("White Crow" episode) (2020) - director
Serve the People (2022)- director

Awards 
2010 47th Grand Bell Awards: Best New Director (Bedevilled) 
2010 30th Korean Association of Film Critics Awards: Best New Director (Bedevilled)
2010 8th Korean Film Awards: Best New Director (Bedevilled)
2010 13th Director's Cut Awards: Best New Director (Bedevilled)
2011 Imagine Film Festival: Black Tulip Award, Best Feature (Bedevilled)

References

External links 
 
 
 

1974 births
Living people
South Korean film directors
South Korean screenwriters